Andreas Vinciguerra (born 19 February 1981) is a former tennis player from Sweden, who turned professional in 1998. He won 1 singles title in Copenhagen; reached the semi-finals of the 2001 Rome Masters and 2001 Paris Masters; and attained a career-high singles ranking of World No. 33 in November 2001.

Tennis career
Vinciguerra is of Italian origin on his father's side.

Junior career
As a junior Vinciguerra reached as high as No. 6 in the world in 1998.

Junior Slam results:

Australian Open: F (1998)
French Open: SF (1998)
Wimbledon: -
US Open: 1R (1998)

Pro career
He experienced significant problems with a back injury, but in 2006 made a comeback, which has seen him edge towards the top 100 in the ATP rankings.

Has played 9 Davis Cup matches in singles, and won 3 of them.

In the 2009 World Group Playoffs in March 2009, Sweden faced Israel in Vinciguerra's hometown. Dudi Sela first defeated Vinciguerra 11–9 in the fifth. Harel Levy then beat Vinciguerra in the decisive final match in a marathon 3-hour, 44 minutes, 8–6 in the fifth, to lead the Israeli team to a come-from-behind 3–2 victory over the 7-time Davis Cup champion Swedes at Baltic Hall in Malmö, Sweden, and allow Israel to advance in the 2009 Davis Cup.

After the Davis Cup, Vinciguerra decided to continue playing and reached in his first tournament of the year the final at the Rome Challenger. He then received a Wild Card to the Swedish Open where he made it to the semifinals.

ATP career finals

Singles: 4 (1 title, 3 runners-up)

ATP Challenger and ITF Futures finals

Singles: 10 (5–5)

Doubles: 1 (0–1)

Junior Grand Slam finals

Singles: 1 (1 runner-up)

Performance timeline

Singles

References

External links
 
 
 
 

1981 births
Living people
Sportspeople from Malmö
Swedish male tennis players
Swedish people of Italian descent
Olympic tennis players of Sweden
Tennis players at the 2000 Summer Olympics